A night game is a baseball game played partially or entirely after sunset. Night Baseball may refer to the following broadcast programs:

 Sunday Night Baseball
 Monday Night Baseball
 Tuesday Night Baseball
 Wednesday Night Baseball
 Thursday Night Baseball
 Friday Night Baseball
 Baseball Night in America, typically on Saturdays

See also
 Baseball Tonight